Neiva and similar can mean:

Animals
Salvelinus neiva, a species of fish

People
Laura Neiva, Brazilian actress and model

Places
Neiva, Colombia, the capital of the department of Huila in Colombia
Neiva Municipality, in Portugal
Neyva River, a 294 kilometer river in the Sverdlovsk Oblast of Russia

Industry
Indústria Aeronáutica Neiva, Brazilian aerospace company